The commune of Mbuye is a commune of Muramvya Province in central-western Burundi. The capital lies at Mbuye.

References

Communes of Burundi
Muramvya Province